Reunion Dinner (simplified Chinese: 团圆饭) is a Singaporean Chinese drama which was telecasted on Singapore's free-to-air channel, MediaCorp Channel 8. It stars Chen Liping, Wang Yuqing, Chen Hanwei, Patricia Mok, Kym Ng, Alan Tern and Zhu Houren as the casts of the series. It made its debut on 6 January 2009 and ended on 3 February 2009. This drama serial consists of 20 episodes, and was screened on every weekday night at 9:00 pm.

Due to the series' heavy Chinese New Year theme, it was broadcast during the Chinese New Year season for 2009.

The series is partially sponsored by the Media Development Authority of Singapore.

Cast

Liang Family (梁家)

Liu Family (刘家)

Wang Family (王家)

Hu Family (胡家)

Awards & Nominations
Reunion Dinner was widely applauded for its script and also its realistic depiction of everyday Singaporean life. In terms of viewership numbers, it was also a considerable ratings success. Many credit this success for the veteran cast led by Chen Liping and Wang Yuqing. Veteran actor Zhu Houren was widely praised for his performance as a demented former police officer and his character's catchphrase "我是警察!" (I am the Police!) was popular with younger audiences. The other dramas nominated for Best Drama Series and Best Theme Songs are Together , Housewives' Holiday , Perfect Cut 2 & Reunion Dinner

Star Awards 2010 
While the nominations were dominated by 2009 year-end blockbuster Together, Reunion Dinner still managed several wins in both the acting and technical categories. The other dramas that are nominated for Best Drams are Daddy at Home, Housewives' Holiday, Perfect Cut 2 & Together.

Notes

Singapore Chinese dramas
2009 Singaporean television series debuts
2009 Singaporean television series endings
Channel 8 (Singapore) original programming